Assunta Legnante (born 14 May 1978 in Naples) is a visually impaired Italian shot putter. She has competed in both the Olympics and the Paralympics, one of the few athletes to do so. , she is the current F11 shot put world record holder. She competed at the 2020 Summer Paralympics, in Women's discus throw F11, and Women's shot put F12, winning silver medals.

Non-disabled athletics career
Legnante won the silver medal at the 2002 and the gold medal at the 2007 European Indoor Athletics Championships, where she captained the Italian team. She finished fifth at the 2006 European Athletics Championships. She competed at the 2008 Summer Olympics in Beijing, having missed the 2004 Olympics due to dangerously high intraocular pressure.

Her personal best throw is 19.04 metres, achieved in September 2006 in Busto Arsizio. Her best indoor result is 19.20 metres, achieved in February 2002 in Genova.

Blindness and Paralympics
Legnante was born with congenital glaucoma in both eyes. In 2009, she suddenly lost the sight in her better, right eye. Her left retina then deteriorated. She had a cataract removed in March 2012, but that did not improve her sight. She now has light perception in her left eye, but nothing more.

The 2007 European indoor champion did not lose heart and started a new career as a Paralympic athlete, training for the forthcoming 2012 Summer Paralympics.

At the 2012 Italian Paralympic Athletics Championships in Turin she set a new F11 shot put world record with a throw of 13.27 metres. On 8 June, at Memorial Primo Nebiolo in Turin, she improved the world record, three times, to 15.22 m. At the London Paralympics, she broke her own world record with a throw of 16.74 metres.

In 2014, she returned to international level throwing 17.09 on 20 June and 17.39 at the regional championships in Naples eight days later.

Achievements

See also
List of athletes who have competed in the Paralympics and Olympics
Italian all-time lists - shot put

References

External links
 

1978 births
Living people
Italian female shot putters
Athletes (track and field) at the 2008 Summer Olympics
Olympic athletes of Italy
Athletes from Naples
Paralympic athletes of Italy
Paralympic gold medalists for Italy
Paralympic silver medalists for Italy
Athletes (track and field) at the 2012 Summer Paralympics
Athletes (track and field) at the 2016 Summer Paralympics
Athletes (track and field) at the 2020 Summer Paralympics
World record holders in Paralympic athletics
Medalists at the 2012 Summer Paralympics
Medalists at the 2016 Summer Paralympics
Medalists at the 2020 Summer Paralympics
Mediterranean Games gold medalists for Italy
Mediterranean Games silver medalists for Italy
Athletes (track and field) at the 2001 Mediterranean Games
Athletes (track and field) at the 2009 Mediterranean Games
World Athletics Championships athletes for Italy
Mediterranean Games medalists in athletics
World Para Athletics Championships winners
Paralympic medalists in athletics (track and field)